Saint-Julien-près-Bort (literally Saint-Julien near Bort) is a former commune situated in the Corrèze department, Central France. On 1 January 2017, it was merged into the new commune Sarroux-Saint Julien.

Geography
The river Diège forms all of the commune's western boundary, then flows into the Dordogne, which forms all of its southern boundary.

Population

See also
Communes of the Corrèze department

References

Former communes of Corrèze
Populated places disestablished in 2017